José Enrique Martínez Genique (born 2 January 1935) is a Spanish politician who served as Minister of Agriculture of Spain between 1977 and 1978.

References

1935 births
Agriculture ministers of Spain